Saint-Cyr-sur-Morin (literally Saint-Cyr on Morin) is a commune in the Seine-et-Marne department in the Île-de-France region in north-central France. Inhabitants of Saint-Cyr-sur-Morin are called Saint-Cyriens.

See also
Communes of the Seine-et-Marne department

References

External links

1999 Land Use, from IAURIF (Institute for Urban Planning and Development of the Paris-Île-de-France région) 

Communes of Seine-et-Marne